The Iroquois Theatre fire occurred on December 30, 1903, at the Iroquois Theatre in Chicago. It is one of the deadliest single-building fires in U.S. history, resulting in 602 deaths.

Theater
The Iroquois Theatre was located at 24–28 West Randolph Street, between State Street and Dearborn Street. The syndicate that bankrolled its construction chose the location specifically to attract women on day trips from out of town who, it was thought, would be more comfortable attending a theater near the police-patrolled Loop shopping district. The theater opened on November 23, 1903, after numerous delays due to labor unrest and, according to one writer, the unexplained inability of architect Benjamin Marshall to complete required drawings on time. Upon opening the theater was lauded by drama critics; Walter K. Hill wrote in the New York Clipper (a predecessor of Variety) that the Iroquois was "the most beautiful ... in Chicago, and competent judges state that few theaters in America can rival its architectural perfections ..."

The Iroquois had a capacity of 1,602 with three audience levels. The main floor, known as the orchestra or parquet, had approximately 700 seats on the same level as the foyer and Grand Stair Hall. The second level, the dress circle or [first] balcony, had more than 400 seats. The third level, the gallery, had about 500 seats. There were four boxes on the first level and two above.

The theater had only one entrance. A broad stairway which led from the foyer to the balcony level was also used to reach the stairs to the gallery level. Theater designers claimed this allowed patrons to "see and be seen" regardless of the price of their seats. However, the common stairway ignored Chicago fire ordinances that required separate stairways and exits for each balcony. The design proved disastrous: people exiting the gallery encountered a crowd leaving the balcony level, and people descending from the upper levels met the orchestra level patrons in the foyer. The backstage areas were unusually large. Dressing rooms were on five levels, and an elevator was available to transport actors down to the stage level. The fly gallery (where scenery was hung) was also uncommonly large.

After the fire, the Iroquois Theatre was renamed and reopened as the Hyde & Behman's Music Hall in September 1904.  In October 1905, it was rechristened as the Colonial Theatre. It remained active until the building was demolished in 1925. In 1926, the Oriental Theatre was built on the site. In 2019, the Oriental Theatre was renamed the Nederlander Theatre.

Fire readiness deficiencies noted before the fire 
Despite being billed as "Absolutely Fireproof" in advertisements and playbills, numerous deficiencies in fire readiness were apparent in the theater building. An editor of Fireproof Magazine toured the Iroquois during construction and noted "the absence of an intake, or stage draft shaft; the exposed reinforcement of the (proscenium) arch; the presence of wood trim on everything and the inadequate provision of exits." A Chicago Fire Department (CFD) captain Patrick Jennings who made an unofficial tour of the theater days before the official opening noted that there were no sprinklers, alarms, telephones, or water connections. The captain and the theater's fireman, William Sallers, discussed the deficiencies.  Sallers did not report the matter directly to fire chief William Musham for fear he would be dismissed by the syndicate which owned the theater. When captain Jennings reported the matter to his commanding officer, battalion chief John J. Hannon, he was told that nothing could be done as the theater already had a fireman.

The onsite firefighting equipment consisted of six "Kilfyre" fire extinguishers. Kilfyre was a form of dry chemical extinguisher also sold for dousing chimney fires in residential houses. The user was instructed to "forcibly hurl" the contents of the tube at the base of the flames. The fire began high above the stage, so the Kilfyre, when thrown, fell uselessly to the ground.

Fire

On December 30, 1903, a Wednesday, the Iroquois presented a matinee performance of the popular Drury Lane musical Mr. Blue Beard, which had been playing at the theater since opening night. The play, a burlesque of the traditional Bluebeard folk tale, featured Dan McAvoy as Bluebeard and Eddie Foy as Sister Anne, a role that let him showcase his physical comedy skills. Dancer Bonnie Maginn was also in the cast as Imer Dasher. Attendance since opening night had been disappointing; people having been driven away by poor weather, labor unrest, and other factors. The December 30 performance drew a much larger sellout audience. Tickets were sold for every seat in the house, plus hundreds more for the "standing room" areas at the back of the theater. Many of the estimated 2,100–2,200 patrons attending the matinee were children. The standing room areas were so crowded that some patrons sat in the aisles, blocking the exits.

At about 3:15 p.m., shortly after the beginning of the second act, eight men and eight women were performing the double octet musical number "In the Pale Moonlight", with the stage illuminated by blue-tinted spotlights to suggest a night scene. Sparks from an arc light ignited a muslin curtain, possibly as a result of an electrical short circuit, although the lamp operator, William McMullen, testified that the lamp was placed too close to the curtain but stage managers failed to offer a solution when he reported the problem. McMullen clapped at the fire when it started but the flame quickly raced up the curtain and beyond his reach.  Theater fireman William Sallers tried to douse the fire with the Kilfyre canisters provided, but by that time it had spread to the fly gallery high above the stage. There, several thousand square feet of highly flammable painted canvas scenery flats were hung. The stage manager tried to lower the asbestos fire curtain, but it snagged. Early reports state that the asbestos curtain was stopped by the trolley-wire that carried one of the acrobats over the stage, but later investigation showed that the curtain had been blocked by a light reflector which stuck out under the proscenium arch. A chemist who later tested part of the curtain stated that it was mainly wood pulp mixed with asbestos, and would have been "of no value in a fire".

Foy, who was preparing to go on stage at the time, ran out and attempted to calm the crowd, first making sure that his young son was in the care of a stagehand. He later wrote, "It struck me as I looked out over the crowd during the first act that I had never before seen so many women and children in the audience. Even the gallery was full of mothers and children." Foy was widely seen as a hero after the fire for his courage in remaining on stage and pleading with patrons not to panic even as large chunks of burning scenery landed around him.

By this time, many of the patrons on all levels were attempting to flee the theater. Some had found the fire exits hidden behind draperies on the north side of the building, but found that they could not open the unfamiliar bascule locks. Bar owner Frank Houseman, a former baseball player with the Chicago Colts, defied an usher who refused to open a door. He was able to open the door because his ice box at home had a similar lock. Houseman credited his friend outfielder Charlie Dexter, who had just quit the Boston Beaneaters, with forcing open another door. A third door was opened either by brute force or by a blast of air, but most of the other doors could not be opened. Some patrons panicked, crushing or trampling others in a desperate attempt to escape from the fire.  Many were killed while trapped in dead ends or while trying to open what looked like doors with windows in them but were actually only windows.

The dancers on stage were also forced to flee, along with the performers backstage and in the numerous dressing rooms.  Several performers and stagehands facilitated an escape through the building's main rear exit, which consisted of an unusually large set of stock double doors that would have normally served the purpose of moving large fly sceneries and set pieces or props into the backstage area of the theater. When this was opened an icy wind blast rushed inside, fueling the flames with air and causing the fire to grow substantially larger.

Many performers escaped from the burning theater through the coal hatch and through windows in the dressing rooms, and others tried to escape via the west stage door, which opened inwards and became jammed as actors pressed toward the door frantically trying to get out. By chance a passing railroad agent saw the crowd pressing against the door and unfastened the hinges from the outside using tools that he normally carried with him, allowing the actors and stagehands to escape. The hot gases and flames passed over the heads of those in the orchestra seats and incinerated everything flammable in the gallery and dress circle levels, including patrons still trapped in those areas.

Those in the orchestra section exited into the foyer and out of the front door, but those in the dress circle and gallery who escaped the fireball could not reach the foyer because stairwells were blocked by high layers of fallen people.  Iron grates (closed during performances to prevent patrons in the cheaper seats from sneaking downstairs to the more expensive lower levels) that barred secondary stairways were still in place but first responders found very few victims near the gates. The largest death toll was at the base of stairways, where hundreds of people were trampled, crushed, or asphyxiated. Patrons who were able to escape via the emergency exits on the north side found themselves on fire escapes, one of which was improperly installed causing people to trip upon exiting the fire escape door. Many jumped or fell from the icy, narrow fire escapes to their deaths; the bodies of the first jumpers broke the falls of those who followed them. Students from the Northwestern University building north of the theater tried bridging the gap with a ladder and then with some boards between the rooftops, saving those few able to manage the makeshift cross-over.

The Iroquois had no fire alarm box or telephone. The CFD's Engine 13 was alerted to the fire by a stagehand who had been ordered to run from the burning theater to the nearest firehouse. On the way to the scene, at approximately 3:33 pm, a member of Engine 13 activated an alarm box to call additional units. Initial efforts focused on the people trapped on the fire escapes. The alley to the north of the theater, known as Couch Place, was icy, narrow, and full of smoke. Aerial ladders could not be used in the alley and black nets, concealed by the smoke, proved useless.

The Chicago Police Department became involved when an officer patrolling the theater district saw people emerge from the building in a panic, some with clothing on fire. The officer called in from a police box on Randolph Street, and police, summoned by whistles, soon converged on the scene to control traffic and aid with the evacuation. Some of the city's thirty uniformed police matrons were called in because of the number of female casualties.

Victims

Mass panic ensued and, attempting their own escape from the burning building, many of those trapped inside tried climbing over piles of bodies. Corpses were stacked ten feet high around some of the blocked exits. The victims were asphyxiated by the fire, smoke, and gases, or were crushed to death by the onrush of other terrified patrons behind them. It is estimated that 575 people were killed on the day of the fire; at least thirty more died of injuries over the following weeks. (The Great Chicago Fire, by comparison, killed about 300 people.) Many of the Iroquois fire victims were buried in Montrose, Calvary, Saint Boniface, Mount Greenwood, Mount Hope, Mount Olivet, Oak Woods, Rosehill, Graceland, Forest Home, and Waldheim Jewish cemeteries. 

Of the 300 or so actors, dancers, and stagehands, only five people died: the aerialist (Nellie Reed), an actor in a bit part, an usher, and two female attendants. The aerialist's role was to fly out as a fairy over the audience on a trolley wire, showering them with pink carnations. She was trapped above the stage while waiting for her entrance; during the fire she fell, was gravely injured, and died of burns and internal injuries three days later.

Aftermath

In New York on New Year's Eve, some theaters eliminated standing room. Building and fire codes were subsequently reformed; theaters were closed for retrofitting all around the country and in some cities in Europe. All theater exits had to be clearly marked and the doors configured so that, even if they could not be pulled open from the outside, they could be pushed open from the inside.

After the fire, it was alleged that fire inspectors had been bribed with free tickets to overlook code violations. Carter Harrison, Jr., the Mayor of Chicago, ordered all theaters in Chicago closed for six weeks after the fire. As a result of public outrage, many were charged with crimes, including Harrison. Most charges were dismissed three years later because of the delaying tactics of the syndicate's lawyers and their use of loopholes and inadequacies in the city's building and safety ordinances. Levy Mayer was the attorney of the theater and its manager was Will J. Davis.

The exterior of the Iroquois was intact and was reopened nine months later as Hyde & Behman's Music Hall. The building later reopened as the Colonial Theater, which was demolished in 1925 to make way for the Oriental Theatre, which was later renamed the Nederlander Theatre.

Additional factors reducing survivability

Protecting the audience from hazards onstage

The risks inherent in flammable scenery and props were recognized even in 1903. Two features, a safety curtain that confines fire to the stage area and smoke doors that allow smoke and heat to escape through the roof above the stage, combine to increase fire safety in theaters. This arrangement creates negative pressure; the stage area becomes a chimney, and fresh, breathable air is sucked through the exit doors into the audience area. At the Iroquois, the smoke doors above the stage were fastened closed. This meant that smoke flowed out of the building through many of the same exits people were trying to use to escape.
 Skylights on the roof of the stage, which were intended to open automatically during a fire and allow smoke and heat to escape, were fastened closed.
 The curtain was not tested periodically, and it got stuck when the theater personnel tried to lower it.
 The curtain was not fireproof. Curtains made with asbestos interwoven with wire create a strong and effective barrier against fire. The asbestos curtain at the Iroquois not only failed to lower but also proved to be both weak and flammable. Chemist Gustave J. Johnson of the Western Society of Engineers analyzed a piece of the material after the fire: "[It] was largely wood pulp. By mixing pulp with asbestos fiber, the life of the curtain is prolonged, the cost is cheapened, and the wire foundation may be dispensed with... It results in a curtain that may get inside city ordinances, but is of no value in a fire." Curtain material was rendered irrelevant by the 500 sq. ft. triangular gap beneath the partly jammed curtain that functioned as a flue for the back-drafted fireball that hurled into the auditorium at 3:50 pm.  Eye witnesses testified that the curtain was still in place when the fireball passed through the gap.

Emergency evacuation

The owners of the theater claimed that the 30 exits would allow everyone inside to escape the building in five minutes. Audiences in 1903 were aware of the hazards of fires in theaters, particularly after at least 384 people died in the Ringtheater fire in Vienna, Austria.
 Some exit doors opened inward into the auditorium and others employed a bascule-type European latch with which people were unfamiliar and that performed badly when the crowd pressed against the door, preventing opening. When people were able to pull the doors open enough to get out, some people were then wedged in the door opening as people continued to push on the door. Today, exit doors open outward, so that people trying to escape will tend to hold the doors open.
 There were no exit signs on fire escape exits and doors were concealed behind drapery.  On the ground floor the drapery was intact after the fire but in the balconies drapery was destroyed by the fireball.
 Theater staff had never had a fire drill. They were unfamiliar with the exits and some refused to open locked exit doors.
 Inadequate illumination.  There was no emergency lighting and auditorium lights had been dimmed for the moonlight act on the stage at the time the fire erupted.  The electric switch box, located directly between the initiation point of the fire, was soon destroyed, darkening the entire auditorium, the only illumination coming from the flames onstage.  (The switch box was later destroyed when scenery drops in the loft collapsed to the stage floor but had become inoperable early in the fire.)
 During performances, some lesser trafficked stairways were blocked with iron gates to prevent people with inexpensive tickets from taking seats in other parts of the theater. (On the day of the fire, there were no empty seats in the house.)  Had such gates been located at primary stairways the death toll would have been higher; first responders reported that few victims were found at the iron gates.
 Many of the exit routes were confusing.
 There were several ornamental "doors" that looked like exits but were not. Two hundred people died in one passageway that was not an exit.
 Iron fire escapes on the north wall led to at least 125 deaths.  People were trapped on all levels because the icy, narrow stairs and ladders were dangerous to use and because smoke and flames blocked the way down.  The stairs on one fire escape exit from the second floor gallery had not been adjusted to accommodate a last-minute engineering alteration during construction that raised the level of the gallery floor inside the auditorium.  As a result the fire escape landing was two feet lower than the theater floor, causing people to stumble and fall onto the landing.

Memorial

Iroquois Memorial Hospital was built as a memorial to the fire. The hospital held a bronze bas-relief memorial by sculptor Lorado Taft. The Chicago Tribune described the marker on December 31, 1911, as depicting "the Motherhood of the World protecting the children of the universe, the body of a child borne on a litter by herculean male figures, with a bereaved mother bending over it". The bronze memorial was removed from the Iroquois Hospital when the building was demolished in 1951. It was placed in storage in City Hall until it was installed in its current location, near the building's LaSalle Street entrance, in 1960. The memorial was rededicated on November 5, 2010, and a descriptive plaque was donated by the Union League Club of Chicago. The dedication was attended by members of the Chicago City Council, the Union League Club and Taft's granddaughter.

Chicago held an annual memorial service at City Hall, until the last survivors died.

Five years after the fire, Andrew Kircher, founder of Montrose Cemetery, erected a memorial on the grounds to memorialize the tragedy.

Legacy
The Iroquois fire prompted widespread implementation of the panic bar, first invented in the United Kingdom following the Victoria Hall disaster. Panic exit devices are now required by building codes for high-occupancy spaces, and were mass-manufactured in the US following the fire by the Von Duprin company (now part of Allegion).

A second result of the fire was the requirement that an asbestos fire curtain (or sheet metal screen) be raised before each performance and lowered afterward to separate the audience from the stage.

The third result was that all doors in public buildings must open in the direction of egress, but that practice did not become national until the Collinwood School Fire of 1908.

See also
 Rhoads Opera House fire in Boyertown, Pennsylvania, January 1908 – 171 fatalities
 Cocoanut Grove fire in Boston, Massachusetts, November 1942 – 492 fatalities
 Beverly Hills Supper Club fire in Southgate, Kentucky, May 1977 – 165 fatalities
 The Station nightclub fire in West Warwick, Rhode Island, February 2003 – 100 fatalities
 Ozone Disco fire in Quezon City, Philippines –162 fatalities

Notes

References

External links

  
 
 Chicago's Awful Theater Horror, Chapter One, a LibriVox audiobook.
 
 Verdict of Coroner's Jury
 Jane Doe victim of 1903 Iroquois Theater Fire disaster
List of and memorials to the 600+ victims of the disaster

1903 disasters in the United States
1903 fires in the United States
1903 in Illinois
20th century in Chicago
Building and structure fires in the United States
December 1903 events
Fire disasters involving barricaded escape routes
Fires in Illinois
History of Chicago
Human stampedes in the United States
Theatre fires